In the 1828 United States presidential election, Georgia voted for the Democratic candidate, Andrew Jackson, over the National Republican candidate, John Quincy Adams. Jackson won Georgia by a margin of 93.58%.

Seven Georgian electors voted for William Smith for vice president, rather than Jackson's official running mate, John C. Calhoun.

Results

References

Georgia
1828
1828 Georgia (U.S. state) elections